Khánh Thạnh Tân is a commune of Mỏ Cày Bắc District, Bến Tre Province, Vietnam. The commune covers 13.4 km2. In 1999 it had a population of 11,665 and a population density of 871 inhabitants/km2.

References

 

Communes of Bến Tre province
Populated places in Bến Tre province